Lucherberger See is a lake in Inden, Kreis Düren, North Rhine-Westphalia, Germany.

Lakes of North Rhine-Westphalia